Nimrod is a ghost town in Granite County, Montana, United States. The GNIS classifies it as a populated place.

A post office called Nimrod was established in 1915, and remained in operation until 1962. The community was named after Nimrod, since this was a hunters' paradise.

References

Ghost towns in Montana
Landforms of Granite County, Montana